Hillies may refer to:

 The Hillies, a region of Bracebridge Heath, Lincoln, England, UK
 The Hillies, students of Haverhill High School, Haverhill, Massachusetts, US
 Haverhill Hillies, a 1900s minor league baseball team based in Haverhill, Massachusetts, US 
 Newburgh Hillies, a 1900s baseball team in the Hudson River League based in Newburgh, New York State, US
 Pittsfield Hillies, a 1920s minor league baseball team based in Pittsfield, Massachusetts, US

See also

 Hillbilly
 Hilly (disambiguation)
 Hill (disambiguation)
 Hillbilly